Alfred Gonti Pius Datubara,  (born  12 February 1934) was the Indonesian Roman Catholic archbishop of Archdiocese of Medan from 1976 to 2009.

Datubara was born in Lawe Bekung in Southeast Aceh Regency, Indonesia, and was ordained to the priesthood in 1964. He served as the titular bishop of the Herceg Novi in 1975. In 1976 at the age of 42 Datubara was installed as the first native-born Indonesian Archbishop of Medan succeeding Antoine Henri van den Hurk. He held the title of archbishop until 2009 when he reached the mandatory retirement age of 75. He is a member of the Order of Friars Minor Capuchin.

References

1934 births
Living people
Indonesian Roman Catholic archbishops
People from Aceh
Capuchin bishops
People of Batak descent